"Good Timin" was a number-one single in the UK Singles Chart during 1960, written by Fred Tobias and Clint Ballard Jr., and performed by Jimmy Jones. In the U.S., the follow-up to "Handy Man" went to number three on Billboard Hot 100 chart and number eight on the R&B chart.  The song extrapolates the historical encounters between David and Goliath and between Columbus and Isabella as reason enough for a boy to meet a girl.

Chart history

Weekly charts

Year-end charts

Cover versions
"Good Timin" was later covered by Kyu Sakamoto in Japanese.

Australian band Ol' 55 covered the song on their album The Vault (1980).

UK band Showaddywaddy also covered the song and released it as a single in 1981, but it failed to reach the charts.  It was also featured on their 1981 album Good Times.

References

1960 singles
UK Singles Chart number-one singles
Songs written by Clint Ballard Jr.
Songs written by Fred Tobias
1960 songs